Nikopol (derived from Greek Nicopolis (Νικόπολις), "City of Victory") may refer to:

Places and regions
 Nikopol, Ukraine
 Nikopol Raion, Ukraine
 FC Elektrometalurh-NZF Nikopol, a Ukrainian football club
 FC Nikopol, a Ukrainian football club
 Nikopol Ferroalloy Plant
 Nikopol, Bulgaria
 Nikopol municipality, Bulgaria
 Battle of Nikopol
 Roman Catholic Diocese of Nicopoli
 Nikopol Point, a coastal feature in the South Shetland Islands in the Antarctic, named after Nikopol, Bulgaria

Entertainment and fiction
 The Nikopol Trilogy, a series of graphic novels by Enki Bilal
 Nikopol, the main character in the 2004 film Immortal, based on the books
 Nikopol: Secrets of the Immortals, a White Birds Productions video game based on the books

See also 
 Nicopolis (disambiguation)